There are several institutions known as the National Aquarium:

Africa
 National Marine Aquarium of Namibia

Asia
 National Museum of Marine Biology and Aquarium, Taiwan

Europe
 National Aquarium Denmark
 National Marine Aquarium, Plymouth, England

North America
 National Aquarium (Baltimore), U.S.
 National Aquarium in Washington, D.C., U.S.

Oceania
 National Aquarium of New Zealand
 National Zoo & Aquarium, Canberra, Australia

Lists of aquaria